Domenick Lombardozzi (born March 25, 1976) is an American actor. He is best known for portraying Herc in The Wire, and is also known for his roles in A Bronx Tale (1993), Entourage, and The Irishman (2019).

Career
Lombardozzi was cast in his first film role at age seventeen, when Robert De Niro cast him in A Bronx Tale as a low level gun dealer named Nicky Zero. He is best known for playing Ray Zancanelli on the A&E television series Breakout Kings and for his roles as Tony Salerno in Martin Scorsese's The Irishman (2019), as a firefighter in Judd Apatow’s The King of Staten Island and on the HBO programs Oz as Ralph Galino, The Wire as Herc, Entourage as Dominick, and Boardwalk Empire as Ralph Capone.

Filmography

Film

Television

References

External links
 

1976 births
American male film actors
American people of Italian descent
American male television actors
Living people
Male actors from New York City
20th-century American male actors
21st-century American male actors
People from the Bronx